The coronation of Emperor Nicholas II and his wife, Empress Alexandra Feodorovna was the last coronation during the Russian Empire. It took place on Tuesday, 14 May (O.S., 26 May N.S.) 1896, in Dormition Cathedral in the Moscow Kremlin. Nicholas II, known in Russian as Nikolai II Aleksandrovich, was the last emperor of Russia.

Preparations
On 1 January (O.S., 13 January N.S.) 1896, the manifesto "On the upcoming Holy Coronation of Their Imperial Majesties" was published, according to which the coronation ceremony was to be held in May, and inviting the Government Senate in Moscow, and other representatives of the Russian Empire, to attend. Responsibility for organizing the ceremony was assigned to the Ministry of the Imperial Court, on the basis of which the Coronation Commission and the Coronation Office were organized.

From 6 May to 26 May 1896 was the official coronation period, with 25 May being the birthday of Empress Alexandra Feodorovna. On 26 May, a manifesto was published that expressed the gratitude of the monarch to the inhabitants of Moscow.

It was proposed that all persons participating in the 9 May ceremonial entrance of the imperial couple to Moscow arrive in Moscow no later than 5 May. The ceremonial entry was to be from the Petrovsky Palace on Petersburg Highway and further along Tverskaya-Yamskaya and Tverskaya streets.

Preparations for the celebrations were the responsibility of the Minister of the Imperial Court Count I. I. Vorontsov-Dashkov. The High Marshal was Count K. I. Palen; the supreme master of ceremonies was Prince A. S. Dolgorukov. The duties of the herald were performed by E. K. Pribylsky, an official of the Senate. A coronation unit was formed from 82 battalions, 36 squadrons, 9 companies, and 28 batteries, under the command of the Grand Duke Vladimir Alexandrovich, under whom was a special headquarters with the rights of the General Staff led by Lieutenant General N.I. Bobrikov. Vladimir Alexandrovich arrived in Moscow and took command on 3 May 1896.

In April 1896, more than 8,000 pounds of table settings were brought from St. Petersburg to Moscow, with gold and silver sets alone weighing up to 1,500 pounds. The Kremlin arranged 150 special telegraph wires to connect all the embassies.

Pre-coronation festivities
On Sparrow Hills—where the Vorobyov Palace used to be, and where, starting in 1817, the Cathedral of Christ the Saviour designed by Karl Whitberg was constructed—a special "royal pavilion" was erected for the newly crowned couple.

On 6 May, the birthday of Nicholas II, the emperor and empress arrived at the Smolensky railway station in Moscow, where they were met by members of the imperial family, dignitaries, imperial officials, and crowds of people. The Governor-General of Moscow—uncle to the emperor and husband of the empress's sister Elizabeth Feodorovna—Grand Duke Sergei Alexandrovich arrived with the couple, having met the emperor and empress at Wedge station. From the station the imperial couple proceeded in a closed carriage to Petrovsky Palace.

The scale and pomp of the preparations significantly exceeded previous coronations.

 

On 7 May, the imperial couple held an audience for the Emir of Bukhara Seid-Abdul Ahad Khan and his heir, as well as his excellency Khan Khiva Seid-Mogamet-Rahim-Bogadur-Khan, in the Petrovsky Palace.

On 8 May, Maria Feodorovna, the Empress Dowager, arrived at Smolensky Railway Station, and was met by a large crowd of people.

That same evening, outside Petrovsky Palace, the imperial couple were serenaded by 1,200 people, which included the choir of the Imperial Russian Opera, conservatory students, members of the Russian Choral Society.

On 9 May, the solemn entry into the city took place. A police escort came first, with a platoon of gendarmes, next came the imperial convoy, a string of carriages with dignitaries, followed by the horse guards, imperial personal convoy, one hundred of the Life-Cossacks, His Majesty's regiment, six in a row, and so on.

Coronation ceremony

On 14 May, the day of the Coronation, in all the churches in St. Petersburg, the liturgy was read and prayers of thanksgiving recited. The metropolitan cathedrals could not accommodate all the worshippers, in view of which prayers were also recited in the squares near a number of cathedrals and some churches, as well as in the Horse Guards.

The coronation ceremony began at 10 am, with the emperor, his mother, and his wife seated on thrones on a special raised platform installed in the middle of the cathedral. The emperor sat on the throne of Tsar Mikhail Feodorovich, Empress Maria Feodorovna on the throne of Tsar Alexy Mikhailovich Tishayshy, and Empress Alexandra Feodorovna on the throne of Grand Prince Ivan III of Russia.

The ceremony was presided over by Metropolitan Palladium, of St. Petersburg, the preeminent member of the most Holy Synod (the Synod at the time of the coronation having been transferred to Moscow). During the liturgy, the metropolitan con-celebrated with the metropolitans of Kiev, Ioanikiy (Rudnev), and of Moscow, Sergius (Lyapidevsky). At the end of the liturgy the emperor and empress were anointed and then took communion of the Holy Mysteries at the altar. In the ministry of the liturgy, among others, John of Kronstadt also took part.

Documentary film footage

The French journalist Camille Cerf shot the only documentary movie footage of the coronation.

Post-coronation festivities
After the ceremony, on the same day, a royal meal was served in the Palace of Facets, in the Kremlin, which was attended by invited Russian subjects and by foreign representatives; and by tradition food was served in other parts of the palace. The following day, 15 May (O.S.), at 10.30 am, a reception for ambassadors took place. From 11:30 am to 3 pm, the emperor and empress accepted greetings from deputations, from all over Russia, in the Andreevsky throne room.

On the morning of 16 May, the kurtag (masked ball) in the Kremlin Palace was the first ball held, and was the first of a number of celebrations and balls.

In his diary, Nicholas II described what happened during those days:

On 26 May, a commemorative silver medal was struck "In memory of the coronation of Emperor Nicholas II".

The Khodynka tragedy

Early in the morning of 18 May 1896, the day of the "national holiday" public feast on the Khodynka Field in honor of the coronation, a stampede led to 1,389 people being killed and 1,300 left with severe injuries, according to official figures—4,000 according to unofficial figures. On 19 May, an official government agency issued a telegram from Moscow that read: "Moscow, May 18th. The brilliant course of coronation celebrations was darkened by a regrettable event. Today, 18 May, long before the start of the national holiday, a crowd of a few hundred thousand moved so swiftly to the place of distribution of treats on the Khodynka field, that the elemental force crushed a multitude of people ...". Coronation events continued according to schedule: in particular, on the evening of the same day a ball was held at the French embassy. The sovereign was present at all the planned events, including the ball, and that presence was perceived ambivalently in the wake of the tragedy.

The Khodynka tragedy was considered a grim omen for the reign of Nicholas II, and at the end of the twentieth century it was cited by some as one of the arguments against his canonization (2000).

Gallery

References

Further reading
Government Gazette, 16 May 1896, No. 105, pp. 5–7 (detailed description of the ceremony and religious rites on 14 May 1896 in the Kremlin).
In memory of the sacred coronation of their imperial majesties Nikolai Alexandrovich and Alexandra Feodorovna. With many illustrations of the best artists. – SPb .: Publishing house Hermann Goppé, 1896, Part I and Part II in a general binding, with separate pagination (a historical sketch by E. E. Golubinsky "Tsar's wedding in pre-Peter Russia"; an essay on the coronations of Russian monarchs from Catherine I to Alexander III; description of regalia, utensils, rooms, ceremonies, receptions, parades, meals, participants, guests and organizers of the celebrations in 1896).
Coronation collection with the permission of his imperial Majesty the Emperor was published by the Ministry of the Imperial Court (inscription on the cover: "Crowned in Moscow. May 14, 1896") – Edited by V. S. Krivenko. St. Petersburg, 1899, Tom I and II (illustrations by N. Samokish, E. Samokish-Sudkovskaya, S. Vasilkovsky; original replay application: A. Benoit, V. Vasnetsov, K. Lebedev, V. Makovsky, I. Repin, A. Ryabushkin, V. Serov. Volume I contains 2 parts: "A historical review of Russian coronations" and "Sacred coronation of the sovereign emperor Nikolai Aleksandrovich and Empress Alexandra Feodorovna". Volume II contains: photos with text, government documents, invitations, programs, tickets, full lists of participants and guests of events). 
Folk festival on the occasion of the sacred coronation of their imperial majesties Emperor Nikolai Alexandrovich and Empress Alexandra Feodorovna. Description of entertainment for the holiday. 1896 (description of the program of the "national holiday" on the Khodynka field). 
. Design projects of coronation celebrations in Russia of the XIX century. M., Buxmart. 2013. p. 438.

External links
Coronation of Nicholas II and Alexandra Feodorovna
 Coronation Celebrations in Moscow 
 Coronation Celebrations of 1896 in Moscow from the "Notes" of General V. F. Dzhunkovsky 
  
  shot by Camille Cerf 

Nicholas II of Russia
May 1896 events
Nicholas II and Alexandra Feodorovna
1896 in the Russian Empire